On 14 September 1986, a bomb blast at Gimpo International Airport, the then-main airport serving Seoul in South Korea, killed five people and injured around 30 others. All the victims were South Koreans.

Officials blamed agents acting on behalf of the government of North Korea for the attack. It took place just six days before the start of the 1986 Asian Games hosted by Seoul. National Police Director Kang Min Chang said North Korea performed the terrorist attack in an attempt to disrupt the Asian Games. He also said the attack was similar to the Rangoon bombing in 1983 when dozens of South Koreans lost their lives.

These bombings, including that of Korean Air Flight 858 in 1987, caused the South Korean government to apply massive security measures for the 1988 Summer Olympics in Seoul.

See also
Korean Air Flight 858

References 

Terrorist incidents in Asia in 1986
1986 in South Korea
Terrorist attacks on airports
Gimpo International Airport
North Korea–South Korea relations
Terrorist incidents in South Korea
September 1986 events in Asia
State-sponsored terrorism
Terrorism committed by North Korea
1986 crimes in South Korea
Building bombings in Asia